In mathematics, a branched surface is a generalization of both surfaces and train tracks.

Definition
A surface is a space that locally looks like ℝ² (up to homeomorphism). 

Consider, however, the space obtained by taking the  quotient of two copies A,B of ℝ² under the identification of a closed half-space of each with a closed half-space of the other. This will be a surface except along a single line. Now, pick another copy C of ℝ and glue it and A together along halfspaces so that the singular line of this gluing is transverse in A to the previous singular line.

Call this complicated space K. A branched surface is a space that is locally modeled on K.

Weight
A branched manifold can have a weight assigned to various of its subspaces; if this is done, the space is often called a weighted branched manifold. Weights are non-negative real numbers and are assigned to subspaces N that satisfy the following:
N is open.
N does not include any points whose only neighborhoods are the quotient space described above.
N is maximal with respect to the above two conditions.

That is, N is a component of the branched surface minus its branching set. Weights are assigned so that if a component branches into two other components, then the sum of the weights of the two unidentified halfplanes of that neighborhood is the weight of the identified halfplane.

See also
Branched covering
Branched manifold

References

Geometric topology
3-manifolds
Generalized manifolds